Sante Poromaa Roshi is a Zen Buddhist priest and teacher, in the lineage of Harada-Yasutani. He was born in 1958 in Kiruna, Sweden, and commenced his Zen training in the early eighties, as a student of Roshi Philip Kapleau. When Roshi Kapleau went into semi-retirement, he also became a student of Kapleau's successor, Roshi Bodhin Kjolhede.

Poromaa was ordained as a Zen priest in 1991. He finished his formal koan training in 1993. In 1998, he was authorized to teach by Roshi Kjolhede, and has been teaching full-time since then. Together with his co-teacher Kanja Odland Roshi, he has been instrumental in the creation of a full-time training temple in rural Sweden called Zengården, as well as the growth and development of a network of city Zen Centers in Sweden, Finland and Scotland.
  
Poromaa offers regular sesshin (meditation retreats) at Zengården, in English.  He also gives public talks on Zen and contributes to Swedish public life through participation in panel discussions on current social,  philosophical and religious issues.

Although an artist by training, Poromaa has had a lifelong interest in science. His investigations of the possibility of finding common ground between the Buddhist and scientific worldviews led to the publication in 2009 of his book “The Net of Indra – Rebirth in Science and Buddhism”.

References

Bibliography

External links
Harada Yasutani School of Buddhism profile

1958 births
Living people
People from Kiruna Municipality
Zen Buddhist priests
Zen Buddhist spiritual teachers
Swedish people of Finnish descent